Tân An is former province of South Vietnam. It was established in December 1889 when Gia Định province was split to four smaller provinces. In October 1956 it was merged to Long An province.

Former provinces of Vietnam
Southeast (Vietnam)
Provinces of South Vietnam